Cotton Press may refer to:

 Cotton Press (Latta, South Carolina)
 Cotton Press (Tarboro, North Carolina)